Naurejpur is a village in the district of Jalaun, Uttar Pradesh India, about 10 km from the Yamuna River. One can reach Naurejpur by taking a bus from Auraiya or Jalaun to Kuthaund, which is 5 km from Naurejpur. The current Pradhan of Naurejpur is Bhure. One Jadaun family lives in the village. It is a very socially, educationally and economically backward village.

Villages in Jalaun district